The Sage Creek Station Site is a former way station on the Overland Trail in Carbon County, Wyoming. Constructed about 1862, the station was built of logs with an adobe fireplace and a dirt roof over pole rafters. The site burned on June 8, 1865, but may have been rebuilt. All that remains of the station are its foundations. The site was placed on the National Register of Historic Places on December 6, 1978.

References

External links
 Sage Creek Station Site at the Wyoming State Historic Preservation Office

National Register of Historic Places in Carbon County, Wyoming
Overland Trail
Stagecoach stations on the National Register of Historic Places in Wyoming